Vortex is a 3D shooter game developed by Argonaut Software and released by Electro Brain for the Super Nintendo Entertainment System in September 1994. Titled Citadel during development, it is one of a few games designed to use the enhanced graphics of the Super FX powered GSU-1.

Gameplay

The player pilots an experimental mech called the Morphing Battle System against the five worlds of the Aki-Do Forces. The player enters the Vortex, to save the Deoberon system, retrieving the core from the fierce forces, the Aki-Do. The MBS can transform between four different modes: The Walker, Sonic Jet, Land Burner, and Hard Shell.

Development and release 
The overall concept of Vortex fueled unconfirmed speculation that the project may have been derived from an unreleased game based on Transformers. However, in a 2015 interview with Retro Gamer, programmer Michael Wong-Powell confirmed that Vortex and Transformers were entirely separate projects, with the latter being cancelled during development.

In March 1994, Argonaut Software was signed as a third-party developer by Atari Corporation to develop games for the Atari Jaguar platform. A port of Vortex for the Jaguar was announced at Spring ECTS '94, but it ultimately was never released.

Reception 

Vortex was criticized for its difficulty and its lag, which was common for Super FX games of its type. Electronic Gaming Monthlys five reviewers remarked that the pace is slow, but complimented the unique concept and high challenge. GameFans three reviewers scored it 79%, 72%, and 70%.

References

External links

Vortex at GameSpot
Vortex at 1up.com

1994 video games
Argonaut Games games
Cancelled Atari Jaguar games
Electro Brain games
Pack-In-Video games
Super Nintendo Entertainment System games
Super Nintendo Entertainment System-only games
Super FX games
Video games adapted into comics
Video games developed in the United Kingdom
Single-player video games